In total 6 awards were presented for National Print, Periodicals, Photojournalism, Radio, Television Documentary and Television News.

The overall winner was awarded for George Alagiah's report on Burundi, broadcast by BBC News.

The awards were hosted by Anna Ford.

1994 Awards

See also

References

External links
 Amnesty International UK (AIUK) website
 Amnesty International UK Media Awards at the AIUK Website
 Amnesty International Website

Amnesty International
British journalism awards
Human rights awards
1994 awards in the United Kingdom